FAP may refer to:

Technology and industry  
 FORTRAN Assembly Program, the macro assembler for some IBM mainframe computers
 Fair Access Policy, a term for a bandwidth cap, limiting Internet usage
 Femtocell  (Femto Access Point), a small cellular telephone base station
 Fabrika automobila Priboj, a motor vehicle manufacturer based in Priboj, Serbia
 Diesel particulate filter (French, filtre à particules), a filter for motor exhaust gas
 Film Academy of the Philippines, the Philippines' official counterpart of the United States' Academy of Motion Picture Arts and Sciences
 Face Animation Parameter, part of the MPEG-4 face animation standard developed by the Moving Picture Experts Group

Science and medicine 
 Functional analytic psychotherapy, clinical psychotherapy that uses a "radical behaviorist" position
 Familial adenomatous polyposis, a condition where polyps form in the large intestine
 Familial amyloid polyneuropathy, a neurodegenerative, genetically transmitted disease
 Fixed action pattern, an instinctive animal behavioral sequence
 Filamentous anoxygenic phototroph, a descriptive term for the Chloroflexia class of photosynthetic bacteria
 FAP (gene), a human gene, encoding for the fibroblast activation protein
 Fas-associated phosphatase, a molecule that inhibits the effect of Fas ligand to make cells initiate apoptosis
 Final Anthropic Principle, a generalization of the Anthropic Principle, proposed by physicists Frank J. Tipler and John D. Barrow

Politics, government, and armed forces 
 Broad Progressive Front (Argentina) (FAP - Frente Amplio Progresista), One of the major national parties at the Argentine Republic.
 Federal-aid primary highway system, part of the United States Federal-aid highway program
 Federal Art Project, the visual arts arm of the US Great Depression-era Federal One program
 FREE Australia Party, an Australian political party
 Free German Workers' Party (Freiheitliche Arbeiter Partei), a former German political party
 People's Armed Forces (Forces Armées Populaires), a Chadian insurgent group
 Peronist Armed Forces, (Fuerzas Armadas Peronistas), an Argentine guerrilla group operating in the 1960s and 1970s
 Peruvian Air Force (Fuerza Aérea del Peru)
 Portuguese Air Force (Força Aérea Portuguesa)

Other 
 Feminist Art Program, an art program for women only
 Fapping, a slang term for masturbation